NGC 6355 is a globular cluster located in the constellation Ophiuchus. It is designated as GCL in the galaxy morphological classification scheme and was discovered by the German-born British astronomer William Herschel on 24 May 1784. It is at a distance of 31,000 light years away from Earth.

See also 
 List of NGC objects (6001–7000)
 List of NGC objects

References

External links 
 

Globular clusters
6355
Ophiuchus (constellation)